Archery will be contested at the 2011 Summer Universiade from August 14 to August 18 at Football Pitch One and Football Pitch Two of Shenwanyi Road in Shenzhen, China. Men's and women's individual and men's, women's, and mixed team events will be held using the recurve bow and the compound bow, with one set of events for each type of bow.

Medal summary

Medal table

Events

Men's events

Women's events

Mixed events

References

Universiade
Archery
2011